Eric Szwarczynski (born 13 February 1983) is a South African-born Dutch cricket player. He is a right-handed batsman.

International career
He made his debut for the Dutch national team in an ICC Intercontinental Cup game against Scotland on 29 July 2005. He played his one and only One Day International against Sri Lanka on 6 July 2006. He has played for the Netherlands on four occasions so far, and has also represented the Netherlands A team and under-23 team.

References

External links

1983 births
Living people
Dutch cricketers
Netherlands One Day International cricketers
Netherlands Twenty20 International cricketers
South African cricketers
South African emigrants to the Netherlands
Cricketers at the 2007 Cricket World Cup
Cricketers at the 2011 Cricket World Cup
People from Vanderbijlpark
Dutch people of Polish descent
Naturalised citizens of the Netherlands
South African people of British descent
South African people of Dutch descent
South African people of Polish descent
White South African people
Sportspeople from Gauteng